William Collett (23 September 1839 – 1 May 1904) was an English cricketer. He played four first-class matches for Surrey between 1869 and 1874.

See also
 List of Surrey County Cricket Club players

References

External links
 

1839 births
1904 deaths
English cricketers
Surrey cricketers
People from Lambeth
Cricketers from Greater London